Bukit Purmei is a small housing estate within Bukit Merah planning area in Singapore, near Telok Blangah estate. Bukit Purmei consists of 15 HDB blocks, private apartments and landed property.

Within the estate, there is Bukit Purmei Hillock Park, a Chinese temple, a church, a small Malay-Muslim cemetery and a Malay shrine called Keramat Bukit Kasita.

The roads serving the estate are Bukit Purmei Ave, Bukit Purmei Rd and Bukit Teresa Rd.

The name means "Serene Hill" in Malay. The word "Purmei" is an older spelling of the standard Malay "Permai" ("serene").

Amenities
There are various shops at the void deck and bus stops in front of the blocks at the neighbourhood centre along Bukit Purmei Avenue. There are also two coffee shops, a 7-Eleven store, two clinics, a Chinese medicinal shop, and a Mega Value shop at the neighbourhood centre. Two primary schools also serve the estate, namely CHIJ (Kellock) and Radin Mas Primary School. There is also the Bukit Purmei Hillock Park in the neighbourhood and Mount Faber Park is within a walk away.

Tang Gah Beo (東嶽廟) is a prominent Chinese temple that was founded by Master Biyu in the 19th century. The temple was proposed for conservation under the Draft Master Plan 2013 by Urban Redevelopment Authority.

Transport
These services serve Bukit Purmei estate along Bukit Purmei Avenue.

Service 123 - Runs between Bukit Merah Interchange and Beach Station Bus Terminal, Sentosa via Tiong Bahru MRT station and Orchard Road.

Service 123M - A supplementary route of service 123 that runs between HarbourFront Interchange and looping at Tiong Bahru Road

Service 131 - Runs between Saint Michael's Terminal and Bukit Merah Interchange.

Alternatively, bus services 61, 124, 143 & 166 pass by Kampong Bahru Road at the south of the estate and bus services 65, 121, 195 & 855 pass by Lower Delta Road.

Neighbouring areas

References

External links
Sbstransit.com.sg

Places in Singapore